The Hajdučica Monastery is a Serbian Orthodox monastery located in the Plandište municipality, in the Banat region in the northern Serbian province of Vojvodina. It was founded during the Kingdom of Yugoslavia in 1939. It is now a nunnery, with nuns from the Mesić monastery.

See also
List of Serb Orthodox monasteries

External links
Monasteries in Banat

Serbian Orthodox monasteries in Vojvodina
Banat
20th-century Serbian Orthodox church buildings
20th-century establishments in Serbia
20th-century Christian monasteries